The men's parallel bars competition at the 2012 Summer Olympics was held at the North Greenwich Arena on 28 July and 7 August. It included 71 competitors from 33 nations.

Feng Zhe of China won the gold medal, his nation's second consecutive victory in the parallel bars competition and third overall. Marcel Nguyen's silver was the first medal for a German gymnast in the event since 1988. Hamilton Sabot won the bronze, France's first parallel bars medal.

The final included nine gymnasts instead of the standard eight after a tie for the last spot could not be resolved.

Background

This was the 23rd appearance of the parallel bars event at the Olympics. Only one of the eight finalists from 2008 returned: fourth-place finisher Fabian Hambüchen of Germany. Danell Leyva of the United States was the reigning world champion; Feng Zhe of China had won the world championship in 2010 and finished second in 2011. Marcel Nguyen of Germany was a two-time European champion.

Azerbaijan, Bangladesh, Slovakia, and Vietnam each made their debut in the men's parallel bars. The United States made its 21st appearance, the most of any nation.

Competition format
The top eight competitors in the qualification phase (with a limit of two per country) advanced to the apparatus final. Qualification scores were then erased, with only final-round scores counting.

Kōhei Uchimura finished fifth in the qualifying round but did not advance because two other Japanese competitors, Kazuhito and Yusuke Tanaka, placed first and second. With Uchimura ineligible, the ninth-place gymnast would advance, but there was a tie. The normal tie-breakers were unable to separate Zhang Chenglong and Hamilton Sabot, so both advanced.

Final results

References

Gymnastics at the 2012 Summer Olympics
2012
Men's 2012
Men's events at the 2012 Summer Olympics